Laura Clough Scudder (July 19, 1881 – March 13, 1959) was an entrepreneur in Monterey Park, California, who made and sold potato chips and pioneered their packaging in sealed bags to extend freshness.

Biography
Born in 1881, in Philadelphia, as Laura Clough, she was a nursing student in Trenton, New Jersey. She worked as a nurse before moving to Ukiah in Northern California, after marrying Charles Scudder on July 4, 1908. She opened a restaurant across from the Mendocino County Courthouse, where lawyers encouraged her to study law.

While there she became the first female attorney in Ukiah (but she never practiced law) before moving south in 1920, to Monterey Park, California, where Charles ran a gas station (a garage and attached brick building at the northeast corner of Atlantic and Garvey) until he was disabled repairing a car. They rented the brick building to a barber who turned out to be a bootlegger, and Laura, who was a Republican and Episcopalian, kicked out the bootlegger. She took over the gas station and branched out into potato chips in 1926 and peanut butter in 1931. The Scudders lived in La Habra Heights She tended a victory garden and wrote a  newspaper column. They had four children.

Potato chips
In the early days, potato chips were distributed in bulk from barrels or glass display cases, or tins, which left chips at the bottom stale and crumbled. Laura Scudder started paying her workers to take home sheets of wax paper and iron them into the form of bags, which were filled with chips at her factory the next day. This innovation kept the chips fresh and crisp longer and, along with the invention of cellophane, allowed potato chips to become a mass market product. Other potato chip makers soon began to package their chips in bags.

Scudder also began putting dates on the bags, becoming the first company to show a freshness date on its food products and sold in twin packs to further reduce staleness and crumbling. This new standard of freshness was reflected in the marketing slogan, "Laura Scudder's Potato Chips, the Noisiest Chips in the World". The Laura Scudder Potato Chip Factory was at Garvey Avenue east of Atlantic Boulevard, Monterey Park, in the 1920s.

She expanded into peanut butter and mayonnaise in order to keep her workforce employed year round since potato chips tended to sell best during summertime. She published recipes to raise interest in her products and was noted for a chocolate cake recipe that used mayonnaise instead of eggs and butter. Ingredients like butter and fresh eggs were scarce during World War II due to rationing for civilians because of the effort to supply the needs of military personnel.

Laura Scudder Inc.

At one point, Scudder turned down a $9 million offer for the company because the buyer would not guarantee her employees' jobs. In 1957, she sold her firm to Signal Oil & Gas of Signal Hill, with a $6 million offer from a buyer who guaranteed job security for her workforce. The new company was called Laura Scudder Inc. At the time of the sale, the company had expanded into mayonnaise, and Laura Scudder brand potato chips held a greater than 50% share of the Californian market. She continued to run the company until her death in 1959.

Post-Laura
In 1987, Laura Scudder Inc. was sold to Borden, Inc. for $100 million. Annual sales for the chipmaker were $126 million in 1986. To avoid union issues, Borden closed all California plants of Laura Scudder Inc. only a year later. Borden's overall culture of mismanagement, incurrence of excessive debt to finance numerous acquisitions, and several restructurings in 1993, led Borden to sell what remained of Laura Scudder for less than $16.7 million. The buyer, G.F. Industries, Inc.'s Granny Goose subsidiary, was already in trouble, and was put up for sale in January 1995. In 2009, Snack Alliance, Inc. licensed from The Laura Scudder's Company, LLC the rights to produce and market potato chips under the Laura Scudder's brand.

According to The J.M. Smucker Company website, the Laura Scudder's Natural Peanut Butter business was acquired by Smucker's from BAMA Foods Inc. in December 1994. In 2009, Smucker's marketed the Laura Scudder's brand of natural peanut butter on the west coast. According to a March 31, 2010, announcement, Snack Alliance, Inc. was acquired by Shearers Foods Inc., a manufacturer of competing salty snacks in different regions of North America. At the same time (2010), it appeared the original Laura Scudder's brand was being actively marketed by a Californian company. These two companies have different packaging for their different Laura Scudder's products, and the Californian company appears to be marketing its products nationwide.

Legacy
John Scudder, Laura Scudder's grandson, created a television documentary called Laura to honor his grandmother. It was completed in 1989 but only broadcast in 2007, because one of her daughters did not want anything made about her. After she died, the documentary was shown on the southern California public television station KOCE.

Laura Scudder's Papers and the Women's Studies Scholarship is at Chapman University. Laura Scudder Program Series is at the Bruggemeyer Library, in Monterey Park. with donations from the Laura Scudder Foundation.

References

Sources

External links
 

1881 births
1959 deaths
American women in business
American women lawyers